Tuakau is a town in the Waikato region at the foot of Bombay hills, formerly part of the Franklin district until 2010, when it became part of Waikato District in the North Island of New Zealand.
The town serves to support local farming, and is the residence of many employees of New Zealand Steel at Glenbrook.

Toponymy
The place name is believed to be a geographical reference to the high bluff nearby that offers views down the Waikato river. In Māori the word  can mean 'to stand' and  'river bank'.

History and culture

Pre-European history

The area was first used as a trading centre for passing waka that would transport goods up and down the Waikato River.

European settlement

A flax mill was built in 1855.

In 1863 war broke out because the British Crown forced the Waikato people out of their lands just south of the river and the New Zealand Government stationed in Tuakau Imperial troops brought over from Great Britain. To help defend the area the Alexandra Redoubt was built as a defensive fort on the bluff near the river. The existing town which was originally intended to be built closer to the Waikato River was subsequently built in an area 2 km further inland.

The railway from Auckland reached Tuakau in 1875, when the Tuakau Railway Station was opened.

Recent history

By 1914 the people of Tuakau had formed their own town district which went on to achieve borough status on 1 January 1955. During its 44 years as a borough, Tuakau had seven mayors:

Amalgamations since 1989 has seen it first become part of the Franklin District governed by a district council and then in 2010 with border changes saw it became part of Waikato district when present-day Auckland Council boundaries were created.

Marae

Tuakau has two marae (Maori sacred or communal place), affiliated with the hapū (Maori sub-tribe or clan) of Waikato Tainui (a tribal confederation based in the Waikato Region). Ngā Tai e Rua Marae and its Ngā Tai e Rua meeting house are a meeting place Ngāti Āmaru, Ngāti Koheriki and Ngāti Tiipa. Tauranganui Marae and its Rangiwahitu meeting house are a meeting place for Ngāti Āmaru Ngati Rangiwahitu , Ngati Kaiaua and Ngāti Tiipa.

Bridges

Tuakau Bridge 

The town's 'Tuakau Bridge' replaced the need for a ferry from November 1902. A span of the original wooden bridge collapsed on 23 August 1929 and was replaced by the current £24,000 ($2.9m at 2015 prices),  bridge from 22 June 1933, designed by Jones & Adams, who also built Horotiu (1921), Te Aroha (1926), Ngamuwahine River (1930) and Fairfield bridges (1937). It was once part of State Highway 22.

Gas pipeline aerial crossing 

Demographics

Tuakau North had a population of 5,013 at the 2018 New Zealand census, an increase of 741 people (17.3%) since the 2013 census, and an increase of 1,404 people (38.9%) since the 2006 census. There were 1,632 households, comprising 2,457 males and 2,559 females, giving a sex ratio of 0.96 males per female, with 1,293 people (25.8%) aged under 15 years, 1,041 (20.8%) aged 15 to 29, 2,094 (41.8%) aged 30 to 64, and 582 (11.6%) aged 65 or older.

Ethnicities were 69.1% European/Pākehā, 32.6% Māori, 8.4% Pacific peoples, 8.5% Asian, and 1.2% other ethnicities. People may identify with more than one ethnicity.

The percentage of people born overseas was 18.0, compared with 27.1% nationally.

Although some people chose not to answer the census's question about religious affiliation, 54.1% had no religion, 32.6% were Christian, 2.0% had Māori religious beliefs, 2.1% were Hindu, 0.4% were Muslim, 0.7% were Buddhist and 1.7% had other religions.

Of those at least 15 years old, 423 (11.4%) people had a bachelor's or higher degree, and 852 (22.9%) people had no formal qualifications. 546 people (14.7%) earned over $70,000 compared to 17.2% nationally. The employment status of those at least 15 was that 2,019 (54.3%) people were employed full-time, 495 (13.3%) were part-time, and 177 (4.8%) were unemployed.

Public Sporting Facilities 
Tuakau has sporting facilities available to the public. The Dr John Lightbody Reserve sporting complex on George Street features a swimming pool, sports fields, tennis courts, netball courts and a skate park. The Tuakau Centennial Swimming Pool is open to the public, is used for swimming lessons and is used by Tuakau School and Tuakau College for sports days. The sports fields are used for athletics, and team sports including rugby, touch rugby, soccer. The sports fields have change rooms and a rugby club rooms. The following sports clubs use or are based in the complex: Tuakau Rugby Football Club, Tuakau Soccer Club. The reserve has public toilets.

Education

The main primary school is Tuakau School, where Sir Edmund Hillary and Hugh Poland were educated.

Harrisville School is located to the north, at Harrisville.

References

Waikato District
Populated places in Waikato
Populated places on the Waikato River